Lorenzo Houston King (2 January 1878 – 17 December 1946) was an American bishop of The Methodist Church, elected in 1940.

He was born in Macon, Mississippi to parents who had once been slaves.  He was ordained in 1907 in the Atlanta Annual Conference of the M.E. Church.  Prior to his election to the episcopacy, he served as a teacher, pastor, and editor.

He died on 17 December 1946 in New York City.

References
Leete, Frederick DeLand, Methodist Bishops.  Nashville, The Methodist Publishing House, 1948.
 Thomas, James S. Methodism's Racial Dilemma: The Story of the Central Jurisdiction. Nashville: Abingdon Press, 1992.

See also
List of bishops of the United Methodist Church

American Methodist bishops
Bishops of The Methodist Church (USA)
1878 births
1946 deaths
Methodist bishops of the Central Jurisdiction
African-American Methodist clergy
People from Macon, Mississippi